Vinko Kandija (May 23, 1934 – March 10, 2002) was a Croatian handball player and coach. Kandija won over 40 titles and trophies in the game with male and female teams.

His coaching career led him from club to club, and he achieved excellent results everywhere, especially with women's teams, he won fifty different titles thanks to his persistent work and expertise, becoming one of the most successful and most respected handball coaches in the country and abroad, and because of his style of coaching and leadership, he was named the "last romanticist".

His biggest achievement was winning the Women's European Champions Cup four times and Women's EHF Cup Winners' Cup once in 1984–85.

Club career
During his playing days Kandija co-founded the RK Trogir in 1958 witch formed male and female handball departments. Kandija mostly coached the women's youth selections at the club before taking on the senior team who he took to the Yugoslav First League in 1967.

During the 1970s Kandija coached women's side Radnički from Belgrade. With the club he won 8 league titles  and four cup titles dominating in Yugoslavia during the decade. The club reached the European Champions Cup semi final in 1974 and 1977, final in 1982 and won the competition in 1976 and 1980. During the 1980–81 season Kandija coached men's team Grasshopper Club Zürich in Switzerland. Kandija move to Titograd in 1983 and coached ŽRK Budućnost for two years winning one league and one cup title and the 1984–85 IHF Women's Cup Winners' Cup.

After his successful run in Budućnost Kandija moved to Austria where he coached women's club Hypo NÖ and men's club SG West Wien (then called UHK Volksbank Wien) at the same time. During this time Kandija 15 titles winning two European Champions Cup with Hypo NÖ and reaching semi-final of EHF Champions League with West Wien. After these feats Kandija was noted as a handball guru in Austria.

Kandija coached RK Badel 1862 Zagreb for one season winning the domestic double and reaching the EHF Champions League final. They lost the match to CD Bidasoa Irún they lost the match by 9 goals on aggregate. The final is well remembered for the riot that happened in the second match in Dom Sportova by the home supporters after Zagreb lost. After Zagreb he coached RK Krim for four seasons. He took the club to their first Women's EHF Champions League final.

National team career
From 1974 to 1979 Kandija was the national team head coach of Yugoslavia women's national handball team. With the team he secured fifth place at the 1975 World Women's Handball Championship and 1978 World Women's Handball Championship.

From February to July Kandija was head coach of Switzerland men's national handball team who he took to the 1980 Summer Olympics in Moscow where the team was placed in eight place. Due to this bad result he was sacked after the tournament.

In 1992 he was appointed head coach of Austria women's national handball team for the upcoming 1992 Summer Olympics in Barcelona. The team finished in fifth place. After the tournament he was appointed head coach of the men's team whom he helped qualify for the 1993 World Championship in Sweden. They were knocked out during the first phase of the tournament and finished in 14 place out of 16 teams.
In 2000 he was once again appointed head coach of Austria women's national handball team for the upcoming Summer Olympics in Sydney. The team finished in fifth place at the tournament. He also led the team to the 2000 European Women's Handball Championship where the team finished in last place.

Death
Kandija died on 9 March 2002 in Vienna. He died early in the morning due to an illness he was struggling with for some time. His funeral was held on 15 March at the cemetery in Trogir.

Legacy
After his death the city of Trogir named their town sports hall SD Vinko Kandija in honor of him.

Since his death there has also been a tournament held named: Memorijal Vinko Kandija where women clubs he coached participate such as RK Krim and Hypo NÖ with the addition of guests.

Honours
ŽRK Trogir
Croatian U-14 Championship (3): 1966, 1968, 1973
Croatian U-19 Championship (4): 1966, 1967, 1969, 1970

ŽRK Trogir
Yugoslav First League Promotion (1): 1966–67

ŽRK Radnički Belgrade
Yugoslav First League (8): 1971–72, 1972–73, 1974–75, 1975–76, 1976–77, 1977–78, 1978–79, 1981–82 
Yugoslav Cup (4): 1973, 1975, 1976, 1979
European Champions Cup (2): 1975–76, 1979–80

ŽRK Budućnost Titograd
Yugoslav First League (1): 1984–85
Yugoslav Cup (1): 1984,
EHF Cup Winners' Cup (1): 1984–85

Hypo NÖ
Austrian Bundesliga (5): 1985–86, 1986–87, 1987–88, 1988–89, 1989–90
OHB Cup (3): 1988, 1989, 1990
European Champions Cup (2): 1988–89, 1989–90

UHK Volksbank Wien 
Austrian Bundesliga (4): 1988–89, 1990–91, 1991–92, 1992–93
Austrian Cup (2): 1992, 1993
Student World Cup (1): 1992

RK Badel 1862 Zagreb
Croatian First A League (1): 1994–95
Croatian Cup (1): 1995

RK Krim Mercator
1. A DRLŽ (4): 1995–96, 1996–97, 1997–98, 1998–99
Slovenian Cup (3): 1996, 1997, 1999

Individual
Lifetime achievement award from the city of Trogir – 2002 (post mortem)

References

Yugoslav male handball players
Croatian male handball players
Croatian handball coaches
RK Zagreb coaches
People from Trogir
Yugoslav expatriate sportspeople in Switzerland
Yugoslav expatriate sportspeople in Austria
Croatian expatriate sportspeople in Austria
Croatian expatriate sportspeople in Slovenia
1934 births
2002 deaths
Yugoslav handball coaches